The Hazlehurst-Baxley Tigers were a minor league baseball team that represented Baxley and Hazlehurst, Georgia in the Georgia State League in 1956. However the team was first established in 1948 as the Baxley Red Sox. The following season the team was known as the Hazlehurst-Baxley Red Socks and a year later, the Hazlehurst-Baxley Red Sox. In 1952, the team began and affiliation with the St. Louis Cardinals and became the Hazlehurst-Baxley Cardinals.

The Cardinals won the league title in 1953.

Notable alumni

 Bud Metheny (1948)

 Mike Milosevich (1949)

References

External links
Baseball Reference -Hazlehurst-Baxley

Baseball teams established in 1948
Baseball teams disestablished in 1956
1948 establishments in Georgia (U.S. state)
1956 disestablishments in Georgia (U.S. state)
Defunct Georgia State League teams
Professional baseball teams in Georgia (U.S. state)
Detroit Tigers minor league affiliates
St. Louis Cardinals minor league affiliates
Defunct baseball teams in Georgia